The 1937 Major League Baseball All-Star Game was the fifth playing of the midsummer classic between the All-Stars of the American League (AL) and National League (NL), the two leagues comprising Major League Baseball. The game was held on July 7, 1937, at Griffith Stadium in Washington, D.C., the home of the Washington Senators of the American League. The game resulted in the American League defeating the National League 8–3.

The game, attended by President Franklin D. Roosevelt, is remembered because of a play in which Earl Averill of the Indians hit a ball that struck Cardinals pitcher Dizzy Dean on the toe, breaking it; complications from this injury shortened the career of the future Hall of Fame pitcher.

Rosters
Players in italics have since been inducted into the National Baseball Hall of Fame.

National League

American League

Game

Umpires

The umpires changed assignments in the middle of the fifth inning – McGowan and Barr swapped positions, also Pinelli and Quinn swapped positions.

Starting lineups

Game summary

References

External links
 Baseball Almanac
 Baseball-Reference
 Video of FDR at the 1937 All-Star Game

Major League Baseball All-Star Game
Major League Baseball All-Star Game
Major League Baseball All Star Game
July 1937 sports events
Baseball competitions in Washington, D.C.